Syringophilosis borini (Bochkoz & Mironov, 1999, is a mite that parasitizes the garden warbler, Sylvia borin, from which it derives its name.

References 

Trombidiformes
Animals described in 1999
Parasites of birds
Arachnids of Europe